Eupithecia regulosa is a moth in the family Geometridae. It is found in Kenya, South Africa, Tanzania and Uganda.

References

Moths described in 1902
regulosa
Moths of Africa